Chapline is a surname. Notable people with the surname include:

 George Chapline Jr. (born 1942), American condensed matter physicist
 Jesse Grant Chapline (1870–1937), American educator and politician

See also
 William Chapline House, stone house built about 1790 in Maryland